William A. Smith was an English footballer who played in the Football League for Blackburn Rovers. Smith's only appearance for Blackburn came in a 2–2 draw away at Stoke on 3 April 1893.

References

Date of birth unknown
Date of death unknown
English footballers
Association football defenders
English Football League players
Blackburn Rovers F.C. players